The Bastide du Jas de Bouffan (Granel-Corsy du Jas de Bouffan) is a historic bastide in Aix-en-Provence, France.

Location
The bastide is located at 17 route de Galice in Jas de Bouffan, a neighbourhood of Aix-en-Provence.

History
The bastide was built circa 1750 for Gaspard Truphème, an Advisor to the Court of Audits. He hired architect Georges Vallon, who designed many other historic buildings in the centre of Aix. The bastide is surrounded by a private garden with ponds, fountains and sculptures. It was inherited by Gaspard's son, Pierre, followed by his grandson, Joseph, whose daughter Gabrielle passed it to her son, Gabriel Joursin in 1854.

The bastide was purchased by banker Louis-Auguste Cézanne, the father of famed painter Paul Cézanne, in 1859. In 1880, Paul Cézanne established an atelier in the attic. He also painted the walls of the living-room. Additionally, he often painted in the garden, looking out to the Montagne Sainte-Victoire from different vantage points. After his father's death, he lived in the bastide with his mother.

The bastide was acquired by Louis Granel, an engineer, in 1899. His daughter married Frédéric Corsy, an anatomist. His son, André Corsy, lived there with his wife, Nina Wakhévitch, and their adopted children until his death in 2002.

The house now belongs to the city of Aix-en-Provence. Since 2006, it may be visited by tourists, by appointment only.

Architectural significance
It has been listed as an official historical monument by the French Ministry of Culture since 2001.

References

Houses completed in the 18th century
Monuments historiques of Aix-en-Provence
18th-century architecture in France